The Eighth Plague Tour was a concert tour by American Heavy metal band Machine Head.
Supports in the first leg of Europe was come from the bands Bring Me the Horizon, Devildriver and Darkest Hour. Robb Flynn made a statement saying that: "This will no doubt be the heaviest show you're going to see this year. A lot of the greatest shows of our last touring cycle were in Europe and the UK, so the prospect of this lineup combined with these crowds has us extremely stoked to get out there and tear it up! New material, great venues, killer fans... we absolutely cannot wait!"

The tour continued through North America, with Suicide Silence, Darkest Hour and Rise to Remain, which began on January 15, 2012 in Denver.
Machine Head was playing on the 2012's Australian Soundwave Festival.

On January 29, 2012 in Buffalo, New York Machine Head invited a 13-year-old fan onstage to play the song Aesthetics of Hate, from The Blackening album. Anthony Potenza was holding a sign that read "Let This 13-Year-Old Play 'Aesthetics of Hate' With You", and the band took him up on it.

In the summer of 2012, the band was playing at music festivals and headline shows in Europe. Evile supported the band on their two Irish dates. Besides those dates, Machine Head was the opening act for Metallica, on several European dates. In August, the band was playing for the first ever Slipknot's music festival Knotfest.

On August 11, 2012 the band played and Headlined Bloodstock Open Air in England for the first time. The band played a special set commemorating the 20th anniversary of the band's first ever live performance so the fans chose 5 songs from their debut album Burn My Eyes

On September 10, 2012, the band announced a second leg of North American dates. The trek kicked off on October 24 with a "warm up show" in Louisville, Kentucky, 2 massive radio festivals in Orlando and Tampa, Florida, and then with Dethklok on October 30 at The Norva in Norfolk, Virginia and will hit 33 cities before wrapping on December 8 in Atlanta.

For the third time in a row, the corporate powers behind Walt Disney Properties pressured promoter Live Nation into cancelling Machine Head's performance at a House of Blues venue on Disney property, which was the December 4th show in Orlando, Florida. The band said in a statement: "While no one is willing to provide evidence that would prove unfavorable to Disney, sources close to events have suggested that Machine Head remains on a "banned list", and while Dethklok, All That Remains and Black Dahlia Murder will still be allowed to play, the corporate powers at Disney have refused to allow Machine Head to perform."

On November 13, 2012, Machine Head exited their North American tour with Dethklok, All That Remains and Black Dahlia Murder due to matters completely beyond their control. Frontman Robb Flynn needed emergency surgery. Flynn had planned to go under the knife in January after completing the tour as he has been playing through the pain of a double inguinal hernia since the tour started in October. He had hoped to continue the tour despite extreme discomfort, but it became too difficult to continue on. Flynn underwent surgery on Wednesday, November 14 in Minneapolis before returning home to California to recover, rest and recuperate. Machine Head rejoined the tour in Portland, Oregon.

This tour was the last with Adam Duce.

Tour dates

 A^ Headline shows, non Soundwave festival dates.
 B^ Opening for Metallica.

Canceled and rescheduled dates

Setlist
{{hidden
| headercss = background: #ddd; font-size: 100%; width: 50%;
| header = Typical
| content =
Diary of a Madman (Ozzy Osbourne cover) 
"I Am Hell (Sonata in C#)"
"Be Still and Know"
"Imperium"
"Beautiful Mourning"
"The Blood, the Sweat, the Tears"
"Locust"
"This Is the End"
"Aesthetics of Hate"
"Old"
"Darkness Within"
Declaration
"Bulldozer"
"Ten Ton Hammer"
"Who We Are"
Encore:
"Halo"
"Davidian"

Source:
}}

Personnel
 Robb Flynn – lead vocals, rhythm guitar
 Adam Duce – bass guitar, backing vocals
 Phil Demmel – lead guitar
 Dave McClain – drums

Support acts
Bring Me the Horizon (November 1–December 6, 2011)
Devildriver (November 1–December 6, 2011)
Darkest Hour (November 1, 2011–February 18, 2012)
Rise to Remain (January 15–February 18, 2012)
Suicide Silence (January 15–February 18, 2012)
Chimaira (February 28–29, 2012)
Shadows Fall (February 28–29, 2012)
Times of Grace (February 28–29, 2012)
Dead Label (May 28–30, 2012)
Evile (May 28–30, 2012)
Engel (June 14, 2012)
All That Remains (October 30–December 8, 2012)
The Black Dahlia Murder (October 30–December 8, 2012)
Dethklok (October 30–December 8, 2012)

References

External links
Official MH site
MH on Facebook
MH on Twitter

2011 concert tours
2012 concert tours